ASPTT Nancy Water-Polo is a French water polo team from Nancy. It is a section of the ASPTT Nancy multisports club.

Its women's team dominated the French Championship between 1994 and 2008 with thirteen titles. In subsequent years it has been second to Olympic Nice, but it still remains a regular in the European Cup.

Titles
 Championnat de France (13)
 1994, 1995, 1996, 1997, 1998, 2000, 2001, 2002, 2003, 2004, 2005, 2006, 2008
 Coupe de France (1)
 2000

References

Nancy
Nancy
Sport in Nancy, France